Kysela (feminine Kyselová) is a Czech surname. Notable people with the surname include:

 Daniel Kysela (born 1970), Czech ice hockey player
 Jan Kysela (born 1985), Czech footballer
 Jaroslav Kysela, developer of the Advanced Linux Sound Architecture (ALSA)
 Marek Kysela (born 1992), Czech footballer

Czech-language surnames